WZWW (93.7 MHz) is a hot adult contemporary music formatted radio station licensed to serve the community of Boalsburg, Pennsylvania, and broadcasting to the State College, Pennsylvania, area.

History
WZWW signed on as WBUS on April 13, 1998, part of Boalsburg Broadcasting, with a city of license of Boalsburg, Pennsylvania. The station was purchased later by Dame Broadcasting in 2001, then by Forever Broadcasting in March 2005.

On January 22, 2019, the station's classic rock format swapped frequencies with 99.5 WMAJ-FM, with the station changing its call sign to WMAJ and assuming a Top 40 format.

It was announced on October 12, 2022 that Forever Media was selling 34 stations and 12 translators, including WMAJ and five other sister stations, to State College-based Seven Mountains Media for $17.375 million. The deal closed on January 1, 2023.

On December 30, 2022, it was announced that the station would adopt the "3WZ" branding and its hot adult contemporary format, which would move from WZWW, within days. On January 3, 2023, the format and branding were moved from 95.3 FM to 93.7 FM, with the station changing its call sign to WZWW on January 11.

Previous logo

References

External links

ZWW (FM)
Hot adult contemporary radio stations in the United States
Radio stations established in 1998
1998 establishments in Pennsylvania